Jorge Luis Sánchez Salgado (born March 23, 1985) is a male volleyball player from Cuba, who played as a libero for the Men's National Team. He was a member of the national squad that claimed the bronze medal at the 2007 Pan American Games in Rio de Janeiro, Brazil.

References
 FIVB biography

1985 births
Living people
Cuban men's volleyball players
Volleyball players at the 2007 Pan American Games
Pan American Games bronze medalists for Cuba
Pan American Games medalists in volleyball
Medalists at the 2007 Pan American Games